Nadiya Ke Paar may refer to:

Nadiya Ke Paar (1948 film)
 Nadiya Ke Paar (1982 film)